Flora Suya is a Malawian actress. She was nominated as best actress at the 6th and 9th Africa Movie Academy Awards ceremonies.

Career 
Alongside Tapiwa Gwaza, Suya played the lead role in Seasons of a Life (2010), which narrates the ordeal of an African maid who was sexually violated by her boss, who then denied her custody of her child. She got Africa Movie Academy Award for Best Actress in a Leading Role for her role in the film. In 2013, she starred in Shemu Joyah, Last Fishing Boat, where she was the love interest of a tourist and wife of a polygamous man, the role got her nominated as best actress at AMAA awards. In 2014, it was reported that she is to feature in the  Zambian film, Chenda, which tells a story about the trouble barren women go through and the negative reaction of African men towards the condition. The film was launched at a cinema in December 2014, and released in 2015. In 2016, her film, My Mothers Story was announced as one of the opening films at the Silicon Valley African Film Festival in United States. the film tells a story on the sufferings women go through to secure their home without help from a husband. In the film, she plays Tadala, a single mother in a gender and cultural sensitive African setting.

References

External links 
 

Malawian actresses
Living people
Year of birth missing (living people)